Thunderbolt is a 1910 film in the genre of "outlaw" films at the time that tended to glorify the life of the outlaw "Bushrangers" that roamed the Australian outback in pre-commonwealth days.  Shortly after this film was made, the government of New South Wales banned the manufacture of this type of film on the basis that they were promoting crime.

It was the directorial debut of John Gavin who later claimed it was the first "four-reel movie" made in Australia. It has also been called the first film made in New South Wales.

Unlike most Australian silent films, part of the film survives today.

Synopsis
Frederick Ward is a cattle drover earning money for his wedding when he is accused of cattle theft and sentenced to seven years at Cockatoo Island. He escapes three years later by swimming across the water only to learn that his fiancée, Jess Anson, has died of grief. He seeks his revenge by taking on a life of crime, becoming the bushranger Captain Thunderbolt.

He befriends some aboriginal people, steals a racehorse, "Combo", and robs the Moonbi Mail Coach. He then enters "Combo" in a horse race and wins. He is rescued from a police trap involving Chinese by a half-caste girl, Sunday. He is grateful to her and they get married. He then holds up the Carlisle Hotel, and narrowly escapes. He takes on a boy apprentice and Sunday dies. Thunderbolt then dies in a shoot out with police on the riverbank at Uralla.

Chapter headings
According to contemporary reports, the various chapter headings were:
 Arrest of Frederick Ward, Cattle Duffer. 
 Death Blow of Jess Anson, his Sweetheart. 
 Thunderbolt's Escape from the Quarry and Great Swim. 
 Thunderbolt's Vow at the Graveside. 
 Aboriginal Kindness and Customs of Australian Blacks. 
 Stealing the Racehorse "Combo." 
 Bailing up Moonbi Mail Coach. 
 The Race for the Cup. 
 "Combo" Wins. 
 Chinese Cunning and Chinese Strategy. 
 "Sunday", the Half-caste Girl, Saving Thunderbolt. 
 His Gratitude and Marriage.
 Sticking up the Carlisle Hotel. 
 Thunderbolt's Race for Life. 
 The Boy Apprentice. 
 The Death of Sunday
 The Dramatic Death of Thunderbolt in the River.

Cast
 John Gavin as Thunderbolt
 Ruby Butler as Jess Anson/Sunday
 H.A. Forsyth as Monckton, the boy bushranger
 Charles Henry Lay as the prison gang guard and later the sergeant of police.

Three Years with Thunderbolt

Original inspiration

The film was based on a narrative written by William Monckton of his experiences riding with Captain Thunderbolt.  Monckton's account was edited by Ambrose Pratt and was serialised in 1905, with the title 'Three Years With Thunderbolt', in the Melbourne's The Argus newspaper.  In 1910 the narrative was compiled as a book, published by The States Publishing Co. of Sydney.

Stage adaptation

Monckton's narrative in The Argus newspaper was popular and was adapted by Pratt and A. Joseph for the stage in 1905.

The play was structured as follows:
 Act. 1: Scene 1. – Kurrajong Station. Thunderbolt Takes a Hand. The Arrival of the Police.  
 Act. 2: Scene 1. – M'Guire's Pub; Scene 2. – Bar Parlour; Scene 3. – Verandah of M'Guire's Pub (By Night).
 Act. 3: Scene 1. – M'Guire's Half-way House; Scene 2. – Bedroom in M'Guire's Hotel; Scene 3. – In the Bush; Scene 4. – Poison Gap – The Coach Stuck Up – The Chase – Thunderbolt's Daring Leap for Life.
 Act. 4: Scene 1. – Squatter Mason's Drawing-room; Scene 2. – The Bedchamber; Scene 3. – Bar-room of M'Guire's Half-way House; Scene 4. – In the Bush; Scene 5. – Squatter Mason's Station — Thunderbolt's Sacrifice; Scene 6. – In the Bush; Scene 7. – The River Bank, Kurrajong – Farewell to the Outlaw.

The play was produced by William Anderson and starred Eugenie Duggan. A cast list from a 1910 production was:
 George Cross as Fred Ward (alias Captain Thunderbolt),
 Alf Scarlett as Mr. Alexander Mason (Owner of Kurrajong Station)
 Max Clifton s Mr. Alf. Scarlett Jack Mason (His Son)
 Rutland Beckett as Geoffrey Marrow, J. P. (Bank Manager)
 Bert Bailey as The Hon. Algernon Chetwynd (Jackeroo)
 J.H. Nunn as Michael M'Guire
 Edmund Duggan as Trooper Denis O'Malley (Mounted Police)
 Harry Reacy as Trooper Smith (Mounted Police)
 Frank Rossmore as Inspector Hare (Police Inspector)
 Carleton Stuart as Patrick O'Sullivan (A Bullock Driver) 
 George McKenzie as Morgan (Bushranger)
 Olive Wilton as Maude Mason (Daughter of Squatter Mason),
 Eugenie Duggan as Sunday

Production

H. A. Forsyth produced the film and adapted Three Years With Thunderbolt into a screenplay. He also appeared in the film as a young bushranger.  John Gavin directed and played the lead role.

Because the film was longer than the typical movies of the time Gavin later claimed that "everyone warned him that his venture was doomed to failure".

Shooting took place in Lithgow and Hartley Vale, with extras recruited from local miners who were then on strike.

The shoot reportedly took less than three weeks.

Reception
A film called Thunderbolt, about the bushranger, was screened in Wagga Wagga in February 1910. It is unclear whether this is the Gavin film, which officially premiered in Sydney on 12 November 1910.

The movie was usually screened accompanied by a lecturer.

Critical
Reviews were generally positive. One critic wrote that:
The film has been admirably produced, being as clear and as distinct as any yet shown in Australia, and great credit is due to the bio operator, Mr. Moulton... Mr. Jack Gavin made an impressive Thunderbolt, being a fine upstanding man, big-enough to fight Jack Johnson; and Mr. Bert Forsyth was all that could be desired as Monkton, the boy bushranger. Mr. H. A. Forsyth is to be congratulated upon the success of his initial attempt at picture production, and his efforts augur well for his success in future efforts.
The Newcastle Herald stated that:
The various scenes were shown with a clearness that lent realism to the picture, which is one of the best ever thrown on the screen in Newcastle. The outlaw's swim from Cockatoo Island, where he had been imprisoned, was a very fine scene, and his theft of a horse followed by his sticking up of the Moonbi mail coach, in which the antics of the passengers caused amusement, was excellent.... The audience showed appreciation by loud applause, which the picture deserved thoroughly.
The Bunbury Southern Times said that the film "is said to be a masterpiece in motion picture cinematography. This picture is full of exciting and sensational plots."

Box office
The film was a big success at the box office, one writer calling it "a boom unprecedented in the annals of local picture showdom." It was so popular, Forsyth indicated he wanted to make further bushranger movies.

Gavin and Forsyth subsequently went on to make a film about Captain Moonlite. Then the two went their separate ways and Gavin made movies on Ben Hall and Frank Gardiner. In advertising Forsyth would claim he was the "original creator" of the films on Thunderbolt and Moonlite, not mentioning Gavin at all.

Thunderbolt was still screening in theatres in 1916.

The film today
The film was thought lost but in 1992 1,452 feet of surviving footage constituting 24 minutes was donated to the National Film and Sound Archive in a cake tin.

According to the archive, "the acting in the surviving footage is broad and unconvincing, and several scenes are poorly shot so that the principal action is in fact taking place in the distance rather than the foreground of the shot." Four of the surviving scenes have a small Australian flag in the corner as if a trade mark. This title was donated to the National Film and Sound Archive in a cake tin and identified in 1992.

References

External links
 
 24 minute extract of film on National Film and Sound Archive YouTube channel
 Thunderbolt at the National Film and Sound Archive
 Images from film at National Film and Sound Archive
 Complete text of Three Years with Thunderbolt at Project Gutenberg
 
 
 

1910 films
1910 Western (genre) films
1910 drama films
1910s rediscovered films
1910 directorial debut films
Australian black-and-white films
Australian drama films
Bushranger films
Films based on Australian novels
Films directed by John Gavin
Rediscovered Australian films
Silent Australian Western (genre) films
Silent drama films
1910s English-language films